Taťána Netoličková (née Kocembová (divorced Slaninova; born 2 May 1962) is a retired 400 metres runner who represented Czechoslovakia. Her greatest achievement was winning the silver medal behind teammate Jarmila Kratochvílová at the 1983 World Championships in a personal best time of 48.59s. A time that still ranks her seventh on the world all-time list.  She won a second silver medal in the 4 x 400 metres relay. In 1984, she won the 400m at the European Indoor Championships. She also holds the world best for the unofficial distance of 500 metres.

Personal life
Born in Ostrava, she is married to Jaroslav Netolička, with whom she has a son. She was previously married to her coach Jan Slanina. Their daughter, Jana Slaninová (born 1990) is also a sprinter, with a 400m best of 53.74 secs (2013).

International competitions

References

External links 
 

1962 births
Living people
Czech female sprinters
Czechoslovak female sprinters
Sportspeople from Ostrava
World Athletics Championships medalists
European Athletics Championships medalists
World Athletics Championships athletes for Czechoslovakia
Friendship Games medalists in athletics